Tova Ben Zvi (born 1928) is an Israeli singer. She is also a survivor of the Holocaust.

Biography 
Ben Zvi was born in Łódź where she lived in the ghetto. Her father was a Jewish cantor. After the ghetto began to be emptied, she was sent to Auschwitz. Later she would find out that she was the only member of her family to survive the Holocaust. After World War II ended, she went to study literature at the University of Jerusalem. Ben Zvi released her first album in 1959. She sings folk music in Yiddish and many of her songs are about reconciliation.

In 2009, Świat Tovy, a Polish documentary about her life, was released. The thirty-minute film was directed by Michał Bukojemski. Ben Zvi was awarded the title of Człowiek Pojednania (Man of Reconciliation) by the Polish Council of Christians and Jews.

References

External links 
Tova's World (English subtitles)

1928 births
Living people
Israeli folk singers
Auschwitz concentration camp survivors
Łódź Ghetto inmates
Jewish Israeli musicians
Jewish women singers
Hebrew University of Jerusalem alumni
Polish emigrants to Mandatory Palestine